Jeremy Blaustein is an American translator and voice director. Blaustein has worked as a localizer, translating Japanese media into English. He has worked on games such as Metal Gear Solid and Castlevania: Symphony of the Night.

Early life 
He is of Jewish descent. Voice actress Maddie Blaustein was his older sister. Blaustein began studying the Japanese language at the University of Iowa and continued his graduate and post-graduate studies at the University of Illinois and the University of Pittsburgh.

Career 
After working at Konami in Tokyo in the mid-90s, he began work as a freelance translator. He is best known for his work in video games, most notably as the translator of the original Metal Gear Solid (1998). He also localized Castlevania: Symphony of the Night. Blaustein was also a translator for the Pokémon anime and movies. He lives in Japan.

He is president of a Japanese based video game localization agency called Dragonbaby.

Major works

Video games
 Castlevania: Symphony of the Night
 Contra: Hard Corps
 Dark Cloud 2
 Dragon Warrior VII
Eve of Extinction 
 Kamaitachi no Yoru
 Metal Gear Solid
Shadow Hearts
 Shadow Hearts: Covenant
 Silent Hill 2
 Silent Hill 3
 Silent Hill 4: The Room
 Snatcher
 Suikoden 2
 Valkyrie Profile

Television
 Pokémon (formerly)
 Ninja Warrior (2008–2009)
 Muscle Rankings (2008–2009)

References

External links 
 
 
 Interview with Superfami.com's Chris Barker mirrored at JunkerHQ.net

Living people
American expatriates in Japan
American Japanologists
American people of Jewish descent
American translators
Japanese–English translators
University of Illinois Urbana-Champaign alumni
University of Iowa alumni
University of Pittsburgh alumni
Video game localization
Year of birth missing (living people)